Ansar Ibrahim (born 25 February 1995), nicknamed "Anko", is a Maldivian professional footballer who plays for Dhivehi League side Eagles FC and the Maldives national team. He is an attacking midfielder. He was born in Thulhaadhoo, Maldives. He made his debut for the Maldives national football team in 2015. He scored several hat-tricks for Club Eagles and is one of the best young talents in Maldives.

References

External links
Ansar at Mihaaru
Anko is second Dhagandey? at Eydhafushi Times
Anko signs FFC at Boalha

1995 births
Living people
Maldivian footballers
Maldives international footballers
Association football midfielders
Club Eagles players